Beregovka is a rural locality (a village) in Araslanovsky Selsoviet, Meleuzovsky District, Bashkortostan, Russia. The population was 129 as of 2010. There are two streets.

Geography 
Beregovka is located 30 km north of Meleuz (the district's administrative centre) by road. Ivanovka is the nearest rural locality.

References 

Rural localities in Meleuzovsky District